The Penn State Nittany Lions football program is a college football team that represents Penn State University, a part of the Division I Football Bowl Subdivision. The team has had 16 head coaches serving 17 different terms since its first recorded football game in 1887.

Key

Coaches

References

 
Penn State
Penn State Nittany Lions football coaches